Owenus is a genus of ichneumonid wasp, named for Denis Owen.

Species
The genus has four species:

 Owenus cingulatus (Kriechbaumer, 1894)
 Owenus crocator (Tosquinet, 1896)
 Owenus minor Townes, 1970
 Owenus variegatus (Morley, 1916)

References

Cryptinae
Ichneumonidae genera